The Advisory Committee on Antarctic Names (ACAN or US-ACAN) is an advisory committee of the United States Board on Geographic Names responsible for recommending commemorative names for features in Antarctica.

History
The committee was established in 1943 as the Special Committee on Antarctic Names (SCAN). It became the Advisory Committee on Antarctic Names in 1947. Fred G. Alberts was Secretary of the Committee from 1949 to 1980.

By 1959, a structured nomenclature was reached, allowing for further exploration, structured mapping of the region and a unique naming system. A 1990 ACAN gazeeter of Antarctica listed 16,000 names.

Description 
The United States does not recognise territorial boundaries within Antarctica, so ACAN assigns names to features anywhere within the continent, in consultation with other national nomenclature bodies where appropriate, as defined by the Antarctic Treaty System. The research and staff support for the ACAN is provided by the United States Geological Survey.

ACAN has a published policy on naming, based on priority of application, appropriateness, and the extent to which usage has become established. The United States Secretary of the Interior is in charge of formally appointing the members of the committee.

Names attributed by the ACAN 

 Abbot Ice Shelf, named after R. Admiral James Lloyd Abbot Jr., U. S. Commanding Officer
 Anderson Scarp, named after Kent Anderson
 Anthony Bluff, named after Captain Alexander Anthony, United States Air Force
 Ashworth Glacier, named after Allan C. Ashworth
 Banded Bluff, named for the bands of snow and rock on the bluff face
 Becker Point, named after Robert A. Becker
 Bennett Saddle, named after Gerard A. Bennett, traverse specialist
 Beyl Head, named after Commander David D. Beyl, U.S. Navy
 Bird Bluff, named after Commander Charles F. Bird
 Blessing Bluff, named after Commander George R. Blessing, U.S. Navy
 Brandau Glacier, named after James F. Brandau, U.S. Navy
 Brandau Rocks, named after James F. Brandau, U.S. Navy
 Brien Rocks, named after Robert J. Brien, aviation electronics technician
 Brookman Point, named after Lieutenant Peter J. Brookman
 Brown Peaks, named after Kenneth R. Brown, biologist
 Brown Scarp, named after  Arthur J. Brown
 Bruner Hill, named after Lieutenant Michael G. Bruner, U.S. Navy
 Bucher Rim, named after Peter Bucher, glaciologist 
 Buntley Bluff, named after Ensign Ronald E. Buntley
 Burnette Rock, named after Chief Warrant Officer Desmond Burnette, U.S. Army
 Burrage Dome, named after Roy E. Burrage, Jr., construction mechanic
 Butler Summit, named after Rhett Butler of Incorporated Research Institutions for Seismology (IRIS)
 Callender Peak, named after Lieutenant Gordon W. Callender
 Campbell Crag, named after Richard J. (Rick) Campbell
 Cantrell Peak, named after Major Robert L. Cantrell, United States Marine Corps
 Cape Cornely, named after Joseph R. Cornely, radio operator
 Cape Polar Sea, named after the USCGC Polar Sea
 Clark Knoll, named after Elton G. Clark, U.S. Navy
 Cleft Ledge, named for descriptive features
 Clingman Peak, named after Otis Clingman, Jr., biologist
 Coor Crags, named after Lieutenant Commander Lawrence W. Coor, U.S. Navy
 Cope Hill, named after Lieutenant Winston Cope
 Cosgrove Ice Shelf, named after Lieutenant Jerome R. Cosgrove, U.S. Navy Reserve, asst. communications Officer
 Cousins Rock, named after Michael D. Cousins, ionospheric physicist
 Crary Knoll, named after Albert P. Crary, scientist
 Creehan Cliff, named after Lieutenant E. Patrick Creehan
 Crosson Ice Shelf, named after Commander W.E. Crosson, U.S. Navy, Commanding Officer
 Curran Bluff, named after Martin P. Curran
 Davey Peak, named after Gary R. Davey, meteorologist
 Davis Knoll, named after Thomas C. Davis, Jr., geologist
 Davis Saddle, named after Clinton S. Davis, U.S. Navy
 DeMaster Point, named after Douglas P. DeMaster, biologist
 DeVries Bluff', named after Arthur L. DeVries, biologist, in conjunction with DeVries Glacier
 Dickinson Rocks, named after David N. Dickinson, construction mechanic
 Dickson Icefalls, named after Donald T. Dickson, glaciologist
 Dickson Pillar, named after Paul B. Dickson, photographer
 Dillon Peak, named after Raymond D. Dillon, biologist
 Dipboye Cirque, named after Richard L. Dipboye, helicopter pilot
 Dorrel Rock, named after Leo E. Dorrel, U.S. Navy
 Dotson Ice Shelf, named after Lieutenant William A. Dotson, U. S. Navy, Officer in Charge of the Ice Reconnaissance Unit of the Naval Oceanographic Office
 Douglas Gap, named after Donald S. Douglas, biologist
 Downs Cone, named after Bill S. Downs
 Draves Point, named after Dale Draves, U.S. Navy
 Dreary Isthmus, named for descriptive features
 Dudley Head, originally named Mount Dudley by Ernest Shackleton and later amended
 Durrance Inlet, Lieutenant Frank M. Durrance, Jr., U.S. Navy Reserve
 Ellis Cone, named after Homer L. Ellis, U.S. Navy
 England Ridge, named in conjunction with Mount England
 English Rock, named after Claude L. English, Jr.
 Eubanks Point, named after Staff Sergeant Leroy E. Eubanks
 Evans Knoll, named after Donald J. Evans
 Everett Spur, named after Kaye R. Everett, geologist
 Favela Rocks, named after Rafael Favela, Jr., U.S. Navy equipment operator
 Favreau Pillar, named after Robert D. Favreau
 Ferri Ridge, named after Guy Ferri
 Fields Peak, named after Master Sergeant Samuel J. Fields
 Fleming Head, named after John P. Fleming
 Folk Ridge, named after John E. Folk, biolab technician
 Fontaine Bluff, named after Lieutenant Commander R.K. Fontaine, U.S. Navy
 Foreman Peak, named after Donald L. Foreman, mechanic
 Fowler Knoll, named after Chief Warrant Officer George W. Fowler, U.S. Army
 Frost Cliff, named after William L. Frost, U.S. Navy
 Fry Peak, named after Frederick M. Fry, U.S. Navy Flight Surgeon
 Furman Bluffs, named after James L. Furman, U.S. Navy staff assistant
 Garwood Point, named after James W. Garwood, U.S. Navy metalsmith
 Gealy Spur, named after William J. Gealy
 Gerrish Peaks, named after Samuel D. Gerrish, ionospheric physics researcher
 Gibbon Nunatak, named after Thomas L. Gibbon
 Glover Cirque, named after Robert P. Glover, cartographer
 Grass Bluff, named after Robert D. Grass, meteorologist
 Gray Rock, named after Alvin M. Gray, radioscience researcher
 Greene Ridge, named after Charles R. Greene, Jr., ionospheric scientist
 Gregory Rock, named after Elmer D. Gregory, aviation maintenance line crew supervisor
 Grew Peak, named after Edward Grew
 Groux Rock, named after Roger G. Groux, U.S. Navy shipfitter
 Harrison Ice Ridge, named after William D. Harrison
 Harvey Peak, named after Paul Harvey, aviation support
 Hatch Outcrop, named after Ross Hatch, U.S. Navy
 Haver Peak, named after D.J. Haver, U.S. Navy
 Hawthorne Bluff, named after Ann Parks Hawthorne, photographer
 Hofman Hill, named after Robert J. Hofman, biologist
 Helios Ridge, named in conjunction with Mount Helios 
 Hill Peaks, named after Joseph Hill, Jr., mechanic and driver
 Jacobel Glacier, named after Robert W. Jacobel
 Johnson Bluff, named after Dwight L. Johnson, biologist
 Jones Ridge, originally named Cape Jones after Dr. Sydney Evan Jones and later reassigned
 Kamenev Nunatak, named after Yevgeniy N. Kamenev, Soviet geologist
 Kay Peak, named after Lieutenant Commander W. Kay
 Kellogg Valley, named after husband and wife glacial geologists Thomas B. Kellogg and Davida E. Kellogg
 Kelmelis Hills, named after John A. Kelmelis, cartographer
 Kemp Rock, named after William R. Kemp, U.S. Navy
 Kennedy Ridge, named after Nadene Kennedy, polar coordination specialist
 Kennel Peak, named after A. Alexander Kennel, ionospheric physicist
 Kerr Inlet, named in conjunction with Cape Kerr
 Kessler Peak, named after Captain Charles L. Kessler
 Kieffer Knoll, named after Hugh H. Kieffer, glaciologist
 Klinck Nunatak, named after Jay C. Klinck, U.S. Navy construction mechanic
 Koci Cliffs, named after Bruce R. Koci
 Kohler Head, named after John L. Kohler, U.S. Navy construction electrician
 Kolich Point, named afterThomas M. Kolich, geophysicist
 Koltermann Peak, named after Major David Koltermann
 Komhyr Ridge, named after Walter D. Komhyr, meteorologist
 Kooyman Peak, named after Gerald L. Kooyman, biologist 
 Kristensen Rocks, named after Captain Leonard Kristensen
 LaForrest Rock, named after B.A. LaForrest
 Lake Discovery, named in conjunction with Discovery Glacier and Mount Discovery
 Lake Eggers, named after Alan J. Eggers
 Lasher Spur, named after Lieutenant William J. Lasher, U.S. Navy
 Lear Spire, named after D'Ann Figard Lear, librarian
 Leibert Cirque, named after Gregg Leibert, helicopter pilot
 Lemasters Bluff, named after Lieutenant Max E. Lemasters, U.S. Navy
 Lepley Nunatak, named after Larry K. Lepley, oceanographer
 Lie Cliff, named after Hans P. Lie, ionospheric physicist
 Lowry Bluff, named after George Lowry, biologist
 MacDonald Point, named after James H. MacDonald, journalist
 McCarthy Point, named after Lieutenant J.F. McCarthy, U.S. Navy
 MacMillan Point, named after Mark T. MacMillan, research assistant
 Mahalak Bluffs, named after Lieutenant Lawrence W. Mahalak, Jr., U.S. Navy
 Maish Nunatak, named after F. Michael Maish, ionospheric physicist
 Marinovic Beach, named after Baldo Marinovic
 Marsh Ridge, named after Robert D. Marsh, cook
 Matsumoto Pond, named after Genki I. Matsumoto, Japanese chemist
 Mayewski Peak, named after Paul A. Mayewski
 McIntosh Cliffs, named after William C. McIntosh
 McKnight Creek, named after Diane McKnight, research hydrologist
 Melcon Peak, named after Mark ("Commander") Melcon, carpenter
 Midkiff Rock, named after Frank T. Midkiff, Jr., aviation machinist's mate, U.S. Navy
 Milan Rock, named after Frederick T. Milan, aviation structural mechanic, U.S. Navy
 Miller Spur, named after Linwood T. Miller, sailmaker
 Mims Spur, named after Julius E. Mims, Jr., radio operator
 Mirfak Nunatak, named after the  cargo vessel
 Mizar Nunataks, named after the  cargo vessel
 Mohaupt Point, named after H.E. Mohaupt, U.S. Navy
 Moran Bluff, named after Gerald F. Moran, U.S. Navy
 Morris Basin, named after Robert W. Morris, biologist
 Morse Nunataks, named after Oliver C. Morse III, ionospheric scientist
 Motherway Island, named after Paul T. Motherway
 Mount Dolber, named after Captain Sumner R. Dolber
 Mount Gaberlein, named after William E. Gaberlein, Chief Construction Electrician, U.S. Navy
 Mount Gester, named after Lieutenant Ronald L. Gester, seismologist/geomagnetist
 Mount Griffin, named after Chief Warrant Officer Joe R. Griffin, U.S. Army
 Mount Heg, named after James E. Heg, Chief of the Polar Planning and Coordination Staff in the Office of Polar Programs, National Science Foundation
 Mount Keinath, named after Gerald E. Keinath, biolab administrator
 Mount Knauff, named after Major General Robert A. Knauff, chief of staff of the New York Air National Guard
 Mount Manger, named after William Manger
 Mount Meunier, named after Tony Kenneth Meunier, cartographer and physical scientist
 Mount Montreuil, named after Paul L. Montreuil, biologist
 Mount Obiglio, named after Lieutenant G.M. Obiglio, Argentine naval observer
 Mount Otis, named afterJack Otis
 Mount Rath, named after Arthur E. Rath, electronics technician
 Mount Seitz, named after Thomas E. Seitz, Chief Construction Mechanic, U.S. Navy
 Mount Sinha, named after Akhouri Sinha
 Mount Slaughter, named after John Brooks Slaughter, director of the National Science Foundation
 Mount Stierer, named after Byron A. Stierer, Airman First Class, United States Air Force
 Mount Suggs, named after Henry E. Suggs, equipment operator
 Mount Sumner, named after Joseph W. Sumner
 Mount Wheat, named after Lieutenant Commander Luther William Wheat
 Mulligan Peak, named after John J. Mulligan
 Murray Pond, named after D.F.C. Murray, driller
 Musson Nunatak, named after John M. Musson
 Oeschger Bluff, named after Hans Oeschger, glaciologist
 Oliver Island, named after David L. Oliver, U.S. Navy cook
 Olson Peaks, named after Gary D. Olson
 Paine Ridge, named after Roland D. Paine
 Paz Cove, named after H.J. Paz
 Pentecost Cirque, named after John S. Pentecost, helicopter pilot 
 Pine Island Glacier, named after Pine Island Bay
 Pinet Butte, named after Paul R. Pinet, geologist
 Poindexter Peak, named after Monte F. Poindexter, meteorologist
 Polar Subglacial Basin, named for geographical features
 Post Ridge, named after Madison J. Post, ionospheric physicist
 Powell Hill, named after James A. Powell, U.S. Navy
 Raymond Ice Ridge, named after Charles F. Raymond, Professor Emeritus at the University of Washington
 Redondo Point, originally named by Argentina in 1957
 Reid Ridge, named after John R. Reid, Jr., glaciologist
 Reilly Rocks, named after Gerald E. Reilly, Jr., USCG, machinery technician
 Renirie Rocks, named after Jack Renirie
 Reynolds Nunatak, named after Clifford E. Reynolds, electrician
 Reuning Glacier, named after Winifred M. Reuning
 Rice Ridge, named afterLieutenant Commander Robert A. Rice, U.S. Navy
 Rowe Bluff, named after Lieutenant Commander Gary L. Rowe
 Rust Bluff, named after Izak C. Rust, professor of geology
 Sayen Rocks, named after L.D. Sayen, photographer
 Scharon Bluff, named after LeRoy H. Scharon
 Sechrist Peak, named after Frank S. Sechrist
 Schroeder Hill, named after Henry B. Schroeder, meteorologist
 Sentry Rocks, named for geographic features
 Serlin Spur, named after Ronald C. Serlin, ionospheric physicist
 Siren Rock, named after Jan C. Siren, radio scientist
 Slusher Nunatak, named after Harold E. Slusher, meteorologist
 Snyder Peak, named after David R. Snyder, aviation electronics technician
 Spilhaus Inlet, named after Athelstan Spilhaus, meteorologist and oceanographer
 Spillway Icefall, named for descriptive features
 Standifer Bluff, named after J.N. Standifer
 Stepping Stone Pond, named for location features
 Stuart Point, named after Frederick D. Stuart, captain's clerk
 Suggs Peak, named after James D. Suggs, geologist
 Teardrop Pond, named for descriptive features
 Temnikow Nunataks, named after Nicolas Temnikow, biologist
 Thwaites Glacier, named after Fredrik T. Thwaites
 Tighe Rock, named after Robert F. Tighe, electrical engineer
 Todd Hill, named after Ronald L. Todd, cartographer
 Trabucco Cliff, named after William J. Trabucco, ionospheric physicist
 Tucker Point, named after Robert L. Tucker, U.S. Navy meteorologist
 Tuning Nunatak, named after Preston O. Tuning, meteorologist
 Tur Peak, named after Lieutenant Juan J. Tur, U.S. Navy Reserve, medical officer
 Velie Nunatak, named after Edward C. Velie, meteorologist
 Venable Ice Shelf, named after Cdm. J.D. Venable, U.S. Navy, Ships Operations Officer
 Walker Rocks, named after Carson B. Walker
 Walts Cliff, named after Dennis S. Walts, meteorologist
 Watanuki Pond, named after Kunihiki Watanuki, Department of Chemistry, University of Tokyo
 Whitcomb Ridge, named after Jean P. Whitcomb, radio scientist
 Whited Inlet, named after Master Chief Quartermaster Robert J. Whited, U.S. Navy, Leading Chief
 Wiest Bluff, named after William G. Wiest, ionospheric scientist
 Williams Pond, named after M.W. (Max) Williams, driller
 Williamson Glacier Tongue, named after John G. Williamson
 Wold Nunatak, named after Richard J. Wold, geologist
 Wunneburger Rock, named after Henry E. Wunneburger, U.S. Navy, cook

See also 
 United States Board on Geographic Names
 Antarctic Treaty System

References

Names of places in Antarctica
United States Geological Survey
Geographical naming agencies
1943 establishments in the United States